Hokejaški Klub Vojvodina is an ice hockey club from Novi Sad, Vojvodina, Serbia, founded in 1957. In its history it has won eight national championships. They play their home games at SPENS, located in Novi Sad. The team is part of the Vojvodina Novi Sad sports society.

Honours 

Serbian Hockey League
Winners (8): 1998, 1999, 2000, 2001, 2002, 2003, 2004, 2022
Runners-up (5): 1996, 1997, 2005, 2007, 2009
Serbian Ice Hockey Cup
Winners (3): 1999, 2000, 2001

Panonian League
Winners (1): 2009

See also

OK Vojvodina – Vojvodina volleyball club 
FK Vojvodina – Vojvodina football club 
KK Vojvodina – Vojvodina basketball club

References

External links
Official website
Eurohockey profile
Serbian Ice Hockey Association profile

Ice hockey teams in Serbia
Serbian Hockey League teams
Sport in Novi Sad
Panonian League teams
Yugoslav Ice Hockey League teams
Interliga (1999–2007) teams
1957 establishments in Serbia
Ice hockey clubs established in 1957